The World Slavery Tour was a concert tour by the heavy metal band Iron Maiden in support of their fifth album, Powerslave, beginning in Warsaw, Poland on 9 August 1984 and ending in Irvine, California on 5 July 1985.

Background
The tour was notorious for being the band's most arduous to date- although it was very successful, the band were left exhausted by its end in 1985 and demanded a break for the rest of the year before starting work on Somewhere In Time in 1986. The band's lead vocalist, Bruce Dickinson, has since explained that "I never thought it was going to end ... I began to feel like I was a piece of machinery, like I was part of the lighting rig."
Overall, the tour lasted 331 days, during which the band performed 189 gigs, the longest tour dates of their career. The tour also saw the band play to one of the largest crowds of their career, approximately 350,000 people at the first edition of the Brazilian rock festival Rock in Rio in 1985.

The tour was notable for its use of props, such as the sarcophagi, 30-foot mummified Eddie and extensive pyrotechnics. Steve Harris referred to it as "probably the best stage show we ever did," and Dickinson commented that, "You could set it up in small theatres or big arenas and it would always look fantastic." The band's 2008–2009 tour, Somewhere Back in Time World Tour, featured a stage set which largely emulated the World Slavery Tour.

Iron Maiden's first full-length live album Live After Death was recorded during the band's four shows at London's Hammersmith Odeon in October 1984 and four shows at Long Beach Arena in Long Beach, California in March 1985. A video entitled Behind the Iron Curtain documented the band's first shows in Poland, Hungary, and Yugoslavia in August 1984, as they were regarded as the first rock act to take a full stage show into the Eastern Bloc.

An 18-year-old Iron Maiden fan, Daniel Pitre, fell 100 ft to his death from a catwalk in the press area of the Colisée de Québec during the Quebec City show. The band learned about the death only after the show.

Setlist
Intro – Churchill's Speech
"Aces High" (from Powerslave, 1984)
"2 Minutes to Midnight" (from Powerslave, 1984)
"The Trooper" (from Piece of Mind, 1983)
"Revelations" (from Piece of Mind, 1983)
"Flight of Icarus" (from Piece of Mind, 1983)
"Rime of the Ancient Mariner" (from Powerslave, 1984)
"Los'fer Words" (from Powerslave, 1984) (Dropped after 26 November 1984) 
"Powerslave" (from Powerslave, 1984)
Guitar solo
"The Number of the Beast" (from The Number of the Beast, 1982)
"Hallowed Be Thy Name" (from The Number of the Beast, 1982)
"22 Acacia Avenue"  (from The Number of the Beast, 1982) (Dropped after 26 November 1984)
"Iron Maiden" (from Iron Maiden, 1980)
"Run to the Hills" (from The Number of the Beast, 1982)
"Running Free" (from Iron Maiden, 1980)
"Sanctuary" (from Iron Maiden, 1980)
Other songs occasionally played were:
 "Phantom Of The Opera" (from Iron Maiden, 1980) (Played on 21 September, 8 and 12 October, and 15 December 1984 and 19 January 1985)
 "Children Of The Damned" (from The Number of the Beast, 1982) (Played on 20 September and 8, 9, and 10 October 1984)
 "Wrathchild" (from Killers, 1981) (Played on 17 September and 15 December 1984 and 25 April 1985)
 "Die With Your Boots On" (from Piece of Mind, 1983) (Played on 22 September and 9 and 10 October 1984)
 "Murders In The Rue Morgue" (from Killers, 1981) (Played on 18 September and 12 October 1984)

Tour dates 

Festivals and other miscellaneous performances
This concert was a part of "Rock in Rio"

Cancellations
 21 August 1984: Pordenone, Italy, Parcogalavani
 23 January 1985: New York City, United States, Radio City Music Hall; cancelled due to health problems.
 24 January 1985: New York City, United States, Radio City Music Hall; cancelled due to health problems.
 25 January 1985: Glens Falls, United States, Civic Center; cancelled due to health problems.
 26 January 1985: Bethlehem, United States, Stabler Arena; cancelled due to health problems.
British writer Neil Daniels states that some proposed South African dates were cancelled when objections arose to the use of the word "slavery".

References

External links
 Official website
 World Slavery Tour Dates

Iron Maiden concert tours
1984 concert tours
1985 concert tours